Fallston High School is a public high school Fallston, Maryland, United States. It serves a thousand students of Harford County.

History
With increasing population growth in this area of once-rural Harford County during the 1970s, the Board of Education determined the need for a secondary school to serve the youth of Fallston. Fallston High School was designed by architect Richard Ayres and built by Cam Construction Company at a cost of $10 million. The ground on which the school is built was formerly a dairy farm.  The land was acquired from local Real Estate developer Mr. Joseph Deigert, with an adjacent four acres set aside as a new home for the Fallston Volunteer Fire Company.  Fallston High School opened in November 1977 with a staff of 73 and a student population of 1400 in grades 6 through 10, with grades 11 and 12 added in subsequent years. The majority of the original Fallston students transferred from Bel Air schools.  Initially the school was a combined Middle/High School but was converted solely to a High School (9-12) with the opening of Fallston Middle School (6th-8th grades) on an adjacent piece of property in 1993. Fallston High School was visited by President Reagan during his time as president on December 4, 1985. The school has a conference room named the Reagan Room to commemorate his visit.

Extracurricular activities

There are many after school programs available to students, including competitive and non-competitive activities. To keep students' focus on academic achievement, the school has an Eligibility Committee to review student academic progress. If a student enrolled in an extracurricular activity is failing in one or more subject, he or she will be declared ineligible to participate in extracurricular activities.

Athletics
Maryland Public Secondary Schools Athletic Association (MPSSAA) Sanctioned Sports

Fall: Field Hockey,
Football,
Men's and Women's Soccer,
Cross Country,
Cheerleading,
Men's and Women's Volleyball,
Golf

Winter: Men's and Women's Basketball, Wrestling, Cheerleading, Indoor Track, Men's and Women's Swimming

Spring: Baseball, Softball, Men's and Women's Lacrosse, Track & Field, Tennis

Non-Sanctioned Sports: Ice Hockey, Bowling

Maryland State Championship Teams 
Men's Cross Country: 1981
Men's Lacrosse : 1985, 1987, 2001, 2012, 2013, 2014, 2016, 2021
Women's Field Hockey: 1988, 1989, 1990, 1993, 1994, 1996, 1998, 1999, 2001, 2007, 2008, 2009, 2011, 2012
Men's Soccer: 1992
Women's Soccer: 1994, 1996, 2009, 2015, 2021
Women's Softball : 2004
Women's Indoor Track : 2005
Men's Swimming : 2007, 2008, 2009, 2011
Women's Basketball : 2009, 2010, 2022
Women's Lacrosse : 2009, 2012
Women's Volleyball: 2010
Ice Hockey: 2010

Academics, arts, and cultural

Honor societies and selective groups
German National Honor Society
Spanish National Honor Society
French National Honor Society
National Honor Society
National English Honors Society
Rho Kappa Social Studies National Honors Society
Student Government Association
International Thespians Society
Mu Alpha Theta 
National Business Honor Society
Science National Honor Society

Competitive organizations
Dance Team (suspended operations in 2017): State Champions 2008, 2011
It's Academic
Envirothon Team
Marching Band
The Fallston High School Cougar Marching Band toured in the Tournament of Bands circuit, as well as the Cavalcade of Bands circuit. It has been to the Atlantic Coast Championships of the Tournament of Bands in the years 1997, 1999, 2001, 2003, 2005, and 2006.  After 2006, the Band stopped competition but continues to play at football games and parades.

Notable alumni
 Sheryl Davis Kohl, former member of Maryland House of Delegates, graduated in 1980
 Chase Kalisz, swimmer, member of the USA 2016 Summer Olympics team, 2016 Olympic Silver Medalist in the 400 Individual Medley, graduated in 2012
 Kimmie Meissner, member of the USA 2006 Winter Olympics team, 2007 U.S. Figure Skating Champion, and 2006 World Figure Skating Champion, graduated in 2007

Notable events

 Then-U.S. President Ronald Reagan visited the school on December 4, 1985.
 Fallston High was featured in Sports Illustrated magazine (February 20, 2006 issue) for the Kimmie Meissner Olympic "Send Off."
 Daniel "Rudy" Ruettiger (Notre Dame University) came to Fallston High as a public speaker.
 Former Attorney General of the United States Edwin Meese III visited the school in 2005.
 Selected by Newsweek Magazine as one of America's top public High Schools in 2009, 2010 and 2012.

References

Sources
Harford County Public Schools
 http://www.newsweek.com/feature/2009/americas-best-high-schools/list.html
 http://www.newsweek.com/feature/2010/americas-best-high-schools/list.html
 https://www.usnews.com/education/best-high-schools/maryland/districts/harford-county-public-schools/fallston-high-9116
 http://mshl.org/news.php?news_id=249123

Harford County Public Schools
Public high schools in Maryland
Educational institutions established in 1977
1977 establishments in Maryland